The Duchy of Cornwall Management Act 1868 (31 & 32 Vict c 35) is an Act of the Parliament of the United Kingdom.

Section 2 - Capital funds of Duchy may be applied in improvement of house property, etc.
A sum need not be repaid under this section if the Treasury, on an application made by or on behalf of the Duke of Cornwall, notify him that, in their opinion, it is in all the circumstances to be regarded as a proper charge on capital. Such notification may be given in respect of the whole or any part of a particular advance or of the whole or any part of advances of a particular description.

References
Halsbury's Statutes,

External links

The Duchy of Cornwall Management Act 1868, as amended, from the National Archives.

United Kingdom Acts of Parliament 1868
Duchy of Cornwall
19th century in Cornwall